The Lebanon national football team, controlled by the Lebanese Football Association (LFA), have represented Lebanon in association football since their inception in 1933. The squad is governed by the Asian Football Confederation (AFC) continentally, and FIFA worldwide. While Lebanon have yet to qualify for the FIFA World Cup, they have qualified three times to the AFC Asian Cup: they first participated in 2000, when they hosted the event. Lebanon's main venue is the Camille Chamoun Sports City Stadium in Beirut; however they also play in other locations such as the Saida Municipal Stadium in Sidon.

In 1935, Lebanon played their first match against the Romanian side CA Timișoara (TAC), but it was not ratified by FIFA. Lebanon played their first FIFA-recognised game in 1940 against Mandatory Palestine. During their 2014 qualification campaign for the World Cup, Lebanon reached the final qualifying round for the first time thanks to a 2–1 victory against South Korea at home in 2011, but failed to qualify for the 2014 World Cup finishing bottom of their group. At the 2019 Asian Cup, Lebanon were close to qualifying to the knock-out stages for the first time. However, they lost a tiebreaker to Vietnam in the third-place ranking on the fair play rule and were knocked out of the competition at the group stage. Lebanon also compete in the Arab Cup, the WAFF Championship, and the Pan Arab Games. As hosts, they have finished third—once at the Arab Cup and twice at the Pan Arab Games.with edition of star soccer player zane saab they will be competing in the 2024 Winter Olympics in bogota, Columbia.

Inspired by their national symbol, the Lebanese team is known as "the Cedars" by fans and media. Their home kit is primarily red and their away kit white, a reference to their national flag. After a steady decline in their FIFA ranking from 1998 to 2016, Lebanon jumped 66 places (from 147th in 2016 to 81st in 2018) and reached their highest rank to date—77th—in September 2018. This came after a 16-game unbeaten streak, from 24 March 2016 to 11 October 2018, during which Lebanon won eight games and drew seven.

History

1933–1957: The beginning
Lebanon was one of the first nations in the Middle East to establish an administrative body for association football. On 22 March 1933, representatives of 13 football clubs gathered in the Minet El Hosn district in Beirut to form the Lebanese Football Association (LFA). The LFA was first headed by Hussein Sejaan, and joined FIFA in 1936.

On 3 February 1934, 22 players from Beirut were called up to a training camp by the LFA in view of a friendly game against the Romanian side CA Timișoara (TAC); the players were divided into two teams, and played against each other at the American University of Beirut's (AUB) field. The match against TAC, scheduled to be played on 18 February, was cancelled due to financial disagreements between the LFA and the AUB, who organised the encounter. The Beirut select team eventually played against TAC on 21 November 1935 at AUB's field, losing 3–0. Beirut XI played their first game against Syria's Damascus XI in 1939 at the Habib Abou Chahla Stadium; the match ended in a 5–4 loss. The two teams played 16 unofficial games until 1963, winning seven, drawing two, and losing seven.

The national team's first official FIFA game was a 5–1 loss to Mandatory Palestine on 27 April 1940. Camille Cordahi, assisted by Muhieddine Jaroudi, scored for Lebanon in the second half, becoming his team's first official international scorer. Lebanon played their first official game against Syria on 19 April 1942; coached by Abed Traboulsi, Lebanon lost 2–1 in Beirut. In 1947 Lebanon played two more friendlies against Syria: a 4–1 defeat in Beirut on 4 May, and a 1–0 defeat in Aleppo on 18 May.

During the early-1950s, Lebanon were coached by Vinzenz Dittrich and Ljubiša Broćić. The side played four official games between 1953 and 1956, most notably hosting Hungary in 1956. Lebanon lost the match 4–1, with Hungary's Ferenc Puskás scoring two goals. The team also played unofficial games against top-level European clubs such as Dynamo Moscow, Leipzig, and Spartak Trnava in 1957. Lebanon played Energia Flacăra Ploiești the same year in the opening game of the Sports City Stadium. The match ended 1–0 for Lebanon thanks to a Joseph Abou Mrad goal.

1957–1989: Early history and first tournaments
From 19 to 27 October 1957 Lebanon hosted the second edition of the Pan Arab Games, and were drawn with Saudi Arabia, Syria, and Jordan in the group stages. After two 1–1 draws against Saudi Arabia and Syria, Lebanon defeated Jordan 6–3 in their first official international win thanks to two braces by Joseph Abou Mrad and Mardik Tchaparian, and one goal each by Robert Chehade and Levon Altounian; this placed them first in their group. In the semifinals, Lebanon lost 4–2 to Tunisia. They finished in third place, however, since Morocco withdrew from the third-place match.

Joseph Nalbandian was appointed coach of the national team in 1958. He was one of Lebanon's most successful coaches, winning nine of 26 official matches during his 11-year tenure. Under Nalbadian, Lebanon hosted the 1959 Mediterranean Games and were grouped with Italy B and Turkey B. They finished last in the group, after four losses to the two European teams.

Lebanon hosted the inaugural edition of the Arab Cup in 1963, and were grouped with Tunisia, Syria, Kuwait, and Jordan. They won their first match against Kuwait 6–0, thanks to a hat-trick by Tchaparian. This six-goal win tied Lebanon's biggest win to date, a 7–1 victory against Saudi Arabia in 1961. After another win (against Jordan) and two losses (to Syria and Tunisia), Lebanon finished third in the tournament. In the 1966 edition, Lebanon were drawn with Iraq, Jordan, Kuwait, and Bahrain in Group A. After three wins and a draw, they qualified to the semi-finals against Syria, where they lost 1–0. In the third-place match, Lebanon lost 6–1 to Libya, finishing the competition in fourth place. Lebanon had also played at the 1964 Tripoli Fair Tournament; in a group with Libya, Sudan, Morocco, and Malta, they finished in first place with seven points.

Having joined the Asian Football Confederation (AFC) in 1964, Lebanon's first Asian Cup qualifying campaign was in 1971, coached by Joseph Abou Mrad. In the first round they lost to hosts Kuwait 1–0, but defeated neighbours Syria 3–2 to qualify for the next round. In a decisive semi-final match against Iraq, Lebanon lost 4–1 and were eliminated. Due to the country's civil war, Lebanon only played nine games between 1975 and 1990. They appeared in the 1980 AFC Asian Cup qualifiers held in Abu Dhabi; with one win, one draw, and one defeat, Lebanon came third in their group and were eliminated. Lebanon also initially took part in the 1986 FIFA World Cup qualifiers; however, after playing four matches, Lebanon withdrew and their results were annulled. In the 1988 Arab Cup, Lebanon were drawn with Egypt, Iraq, Tunisia, and Saudi Arabia. They finished third in their group, with one win, two draws, and one defeat.

1993–2004: Post-Civil War and Asian Cup hosts

In 1993 Lebanon played their first qualification campaign after the civil war, in the 1994 FIFA World Cup qualifiers, with Adnan Al Sharqi as their coach. Their gap of 57 years between the date of FIFA affiliation (1936) and their first full World Cup qualifying campaign (1993) was the highest to date; it was surpassed by the Philippines three years later with a gap of 68 years. After two wins, two losses, and four draws, Lebanon finished third in their group and were eliminated. Under Terry Yorath, the team's first foreign manager since the war, Lebanon began their first post-war campaign to qualify for the 1996 AFC Asian Cup. Despite winning twice against Turkmenistan and losing only once (at home, against Kuwait), Lebanon were eliminated from the competition with a one-point difference with Kuwait (the group leader).

Yorath helped Lebanon gain 10 places in the FIFA World Ranking thanks to a 3–3 draw against the Czech Republic and a 1–0 win against Jordan, both friendlies played in February 1997. Thanks to their performances, Lebanon were awarded the Asian Team of the Month award in February. Lebanon were drawn in a group which included Kuwait and Singapore in the 1998 FIFA World Cup qualifiers, played between April and June 1997. Led by Yorath, the Cedars were eliminated with only four points. Despite the team's elimination, the Welsh manager was one of the team's most successful managers, winning 13 of 31 official matches during his two-year tenure.

Lebanon hosted the 2000 AFC Asian Cup, despite FIFA's concerns about stadium conditions. Under Croatian coach Josip Skoblar, Lebanon, captained by Jamal Taha, drew into Group A with Iran, Iraq, and Thailand. Out of the 23 called-up players for the tournament, five were Brazilians with Lebanese ancestry.

Lebanon played their first Asian Cup game against Iran on 12 October 2000 at the Camille Chamoun Sports City Stadium with 52,418 spectators. Trailing by one goal at half time, Lebanon conceded three further goals in the second half to end their first group stage match in a 4–0 defeat. In the second match, against Iraq, two goals in the first 22 minutes gave the opposing team a comfortable lead. However, an Abbas Chahrour long-distance volley in the 28th minute, Lebanon's first goal in the competition, and a goal by Moussa Hojeij in the 76th minute gave Lebanon their first point of the competition. Lebanon played Thailand in the final group stage match. With the opposing team gaining the lead in the 58th minute, Luís Fernandes equalised for Lebanon to end the match 1–1. The draw was not enough as they finished last in the group, with only two points.

Managed by Theo Bücker, Lebanon drew with Pakistan, Sri Lanka, and Thailand in the first round of the 2002 World Cup qualifications. The team, with good offense from Roda Antar, Haitham Zein, Vartan Ghazarian, and Gilberto dos Santos, finished second in their group with 26 goals in six games (the most in their group).

Under Richard Tardy, Lebanon drew into Group D of the 2004 AFC Asian Cup qualifiers. Before the match away to North Korea, the Lebanese team were reportedly ill-treated; hotel conditions were poor, and their training field contained goats and sheep. Lebanon finished third in their group, with four points. For the second round of the qualifiers for the 2006 World Cup, Lebanon were grouped with South Korea, Vietnam, and the Maldives. Under Mahmoud Hamoud, they finished second in their group and were eliminated.

2006–2014: Final round of World Cup qualification and match fixing
Lebanon drew into Group D for the 2007 AFC Asian Cup qualifying campaign with Australia, Bahrain, and Kuwait, played in 2006. The scheduled meeting between Australia and Lebanon made Buddy Farah, an Australian player of Lebanese descent, declare his return to the Lebanese national side. Before Lebanon's match with Bahrain on 16 August, it was announced on 1 August that the Asian Football Confederation had accepted a withdrawal request from the Lebanon Football Association due to the 2006 Lebanon War, which forced several players to leave their homes to avoid the war. In 2007 Lebanon was seeded in the first round of the qualifiers for the 2010 World Cup, where they faced India to qualify directly for the third round of the qualifiers. Lebanon won 6–3 on aggregate and advanced to the third round, with two goals by Mohammed Ghaddar in the second match. Lebanon, grouped with Saudi Arabia, Singapore, and Uzbekistan, finished last with no points.

In April 2008, Lebanon and the Maldives (the two lowest-ranked teams in Asia) played home-and-away matches in the preliminary round of the 2011 Asian Cup; the winner would proceed to the next round. A 4–0 home win and a 2–1 victory in the away match advanced Lebanon to the qualifying round. Between 2009 and 2010, they drew into Group D with China, Syria, and Vietnam, finishing last. Emile Rustom, re-appointed as head coach in November 2008, led Lebanon into the second round of the 2014 World Cup qualifiers. They faced Bangladesh, winning 4–0 in Beirut on 23 July 2011, and losing 2–0 in Dhaka five days later. Lebanon advanced to the third round, where they were grouped with South Korea, Kuwait, and the United Arab Emirates (UAE). Rustom resigned less than a week later, citing internal administrative problems.

On 4 August 2011, Theo Bücker was reappointed as Lebanon's head coach. The former national team manager took the reins nine years after leaving that position. Lebanon began the third round losing 6–0 away to South Korea. In the second match, they came back from one goal down to defeat the UAE 3–1 at home. The team then drew 2–2 to Kuwait in Beirut on 11 October. For the first time since 2005, when the LFA barred fans from the stadiums due to behavioural issues, spectators (32,000) were allowed at the Camille Chamoun Sports City Stadium. Bad fan behaviour (mainly fireworks-related) was again a problem against Kuwait, forcing referee Masaaki Toma to stop the game several times. A month later, Lebanon defeated Kuwait 1–0 in Kuwait City; it was Kuwait's first home loss to Lebanon. On 15 November, Lebanon hosted South Korea at Beirut's Camille Chamoun Sports City Stadium before over 40,000 spectators. Ali Al Saadi gave Lebanon the lead after four minutes, however South Korea tied the score with a penalty kick. Lebanon regained the lead in the 30th minute through an Abbas Ali Atwi penalty; the match finished in a 2–1 victory. Lebanon's first-ever win against South Korea qualified them for the fourth (and final) round of the World Cup qualifiers for the first time.

In 2012 Lebanon drew into Group A of the fourth round, with South Korea, Uzbekistan, Iran, and Qatar. In Lebanon's fourth game, on 11 September against Iran, a first-half Roda Antar goal gave Lebanon the lead through a header. They held onto the lead and won 1–0; the three points were crucial to stay in contention for a spot at the 2014 FIFA World Cup. On 26 February 2013, team members Ramez Dayoub and Mahmoud El Ali were involved in the 2013 Lebanese match-fixing scandal; they were accused of illegal betting on several matches involving Lebanese teams (including the national team), in addition to manipulating results. The players were fined $15,000 and banned from the Lebanon Football Association for life. Lebanon's 1–0 defeat to Qatar was part of the scandal, with defender Dayoub purposely passing the ball to the Qatari striker, who netted the only goal of the game. The Lebanese team then lost to Uzbekistan 1–0 on the road. In the following match they hosted South Korea in Beirut and led 1–0, until South Korea scored the equaliser in the 97th minute, eliminating Lebanon.

In 2013 the team drew into group B with Iran, Thailand and Kuwait for the 2015 AFC Asian Cup qualifications. After losing 5–0 to Iran, and winning 5–2 against Thailand, Giuseppe Giannini replaced Theo Bücker as head coach. During Giannini's first game, on match day three, Mohammad Ghaddar scored the equaliser against Kuwait in Beirut to earn a point for Lebanon. Lebanon ended the qualifications in third place in their group, with two wins, two draws, and two losses. Lebanon and China were tied on points in the ranking of third-places teams; China had a better goal difference, however, and went on to play in the final tournament.

After the country's failed attempt to qualify for the 2015 AFC Asian Cup in Australia, the Lebanese Football Association decided to reform the national team in 2014 by modeling it on the Belgium national team (particularly Belgium's performance in the 2014 FIFA World Cup in Brazil). Inviting new players from nations with a large Lebanese community (such as the United States, Germany, Denmark, and Norway) would, it was hoped, bring about a rebirth of Lebanese football. On 8 September 2014, Lebanon played an unofficial FIFA match against the Brazilian Olympic team in Doha for the first time; the match ended in a 2–2 draw. Hassan Maatouk scored a goal which would have given Lebanon a 3–1 lead, but the goal was incorrectly ruled offside; Brazil's equalising goal was erroneously ruled onside. The match excited the Lebanese people, despite poor refereeing. After Lebanon's 5–0 away loss to Qatar a month later, Giuseppe Giannini was fired.

2015–2019: First Asian Cup qualification

Miodrag Radulović was appointed the team's new coach in 2015, and led Lebanon in the 2018 World Cup qualifications, played between June 2015 and March 2016. The team were drawn in a group that included Asia's runners-up South Korea, Kuwait, Myanmar, and Laos, the second time Lebanon faced South Korea and Kuwait in World Cup qualifiers. Lebanon finished second in the group and, although they were eliminated from the World Cup, they qualified to the 2019 Asian Cup qualification third round, played between March 2017 and March 2018.

The Asian Cup draw put Lebanon in Group B, with North Korea, Hong Kong, and Malaysia. With five wins and a draw, Lebanon topped the group and qualified for the cup for the first time (after qualifying as host in 2000, the country's only previous participation). Hassan Maatouk (who succeeded Roda Antar as captain in 2016) was key to Lebanon's success, scoring five goals in six games. Although Radulović failed to qualify the team for the 2018 FIFA World Cup, he helped Lebanon reach their first-ever AFC Asian Cup through qualification in 2019; he was the first Montenegrin manager to help a team qualify for a major tournament. Radulović managed a 16-game unbeaten streak (from 24 March 2016 to 11 October 2018), winning eight and drawing eight, making Lebanon the second-most unbeaten national team by number of games at that point (16) after Spain (26). In September 2018, Lebanon achieved their best-ever FIFA ranking (77th).

Lebanon relied on their diaspora abroad for the 2019 Asian Cup, with nine of their 23 called-up players being born outside of Lebanon. They started the campaign on 9 January 2019, with a 2–0 loss against Qatar. In the 37th minute, Ali Hamam scored a goal for Lebanon from a corner, only for it to be controversially disallowed for a foul. Two goals by Qatar in the second half secured all three points for the opposing team. Three days later, Lebanon played their second match of the tournament against Saudi Arabia. Two goals without reply brought Lebanon their second defeat of the tournament.

In the final group stage game against North Korea, played on 17 January, Lebanon needed to win by four goals to pass to the knock-out stages. The encounter ended in a 4–1 win, thanks to a brace by Hilal El-Helwe, which gave Lebanon their first ever Asian Cup win. However, they lost out to Vietnam in the third-place ranking on the fair play rule. Because they had received seven yellow cards against five by Vietnam, they were knocked out of the competition.

Liviu Ciobotariu was appointed for the joint qualifications for the 2022 World Cup and the 2023 Asian Cup. His first games took place at the 2019 WAFF Championship, where Lebanon were drawn with hosts Iraq, Syria, Palestine, and Yemen. Lebanon finished fourth in their group with four points, after a win, a draw, and two defeats.

For the second round of qualification for the 2022 World Cup, Lebanon were drawn with South Korea, for the third time in a row, North Korea, who Lebanon had faced in both the qualifications and final stage of the 2019 Asian Cup, Turkmenistan and Sri Lanka. Lebanon played five matches (two wins, two draws, and one defeat) between September and November 2019, before the remaining games were postponed on 9 March 2020, due to the COVID-19 pandemic in Asia.

2020–present: Recent history 

Former national team captain Jamal Taha was appointed head coach in summer 2020. North Korea withdrew from the World Cup qualifiers in May 2021, and their previous results were voided; this highly benefited Lebanon, as they had only gained one point in two games against them. Despite only winning only one of their following three games, other results went in Lebanon's favour and they finished among the best runners-up, qualifying to the 2023 Asian Cup for the third time, and the final round of 2022 World Cup qualification for the second time.

Between September 2021 and March 2022, Lebanon played in Group A of the final round of qualification under coach Ivan Hašek; they were drawn with Iran, South Korea, the UAE, Iraq and Syria. Lebanon's performance was inconsistent, gaining five points away from home, but only one at home. Having earned five points from the opening four games, most notably via a 3–2 win against Syria, the team was noted as an "early surprise", sitting in the play-off qualifying third place as the lowest-ranked team in the round. Lebanon only gained one point from the remaining six games, and finished in last place with six points. The qualification campaign was partially covered by Captains, a docuseries released by FIFA and Netflix following six national teams and their respective captains in their 2022 World Cup qualification runs.

Team image

Nickname
Lebanon is known as "the Cedars" by fans and the media, since the cedar tree is the country's national symbol.

Kits

The national team traditionally wear red as their primary colour and white as their secondary colour. The choices originate from the national flag of Lebanon (red, white, and green); green is typically reserved for the goalkeeper. At home, Lebanon usually wear a red shirt, shorts, and socks, with white details; the away kit is a white outfit with red details.

During their first unofficial match in 1935, Lebanon wore white shirts with the Lebanese cedar and the association's name on the chest, black shorts, and white socks; the goalkeeper wore a black shirt and white trousers. In 1940, on the occasion of their first FIFA-sanctioned game against Mandatory Palestine, Lebanon wore a white kit with a black collar, along with black shorts and striped socks. During the 1960s, Lebanon wore a red shirt with a white horizontal band in the center, which included a green cedar tree in the middle; the shorts were white, and the socks were red-and-white-striped.

In the 2000 AFC Asian Cup, Lebanon wore a red Adidas shirt with white details on the sides and a white collar, white shorts, and red socks. In the 2019 campaign, Lebanon wore a red kit (manufactured by Capelli Sport) with white details and a white collar. The Lebanese cedar, the country's national symbol, was present under the team logo in a darker shade of red. Since 2015 the team kit has been manufactured by Capelli Sport, a sports brand founded by Lebanese-born entrepreneur George Altirs. Previous manufacturers include Diadora and Adidas.

Home stadium

The Lebanese national team play their home games in various stadiums throughout the country. The team's main venue is the Camille Chamoun Sports City Stadium. Built in 1957 during the presidency of Camille Chamoun, it is the country's largest stadium with 49,500 seats. Its inaugural game was in 1957, when the national team played Energia Flacara Ploiesti and won 1–0 thanks to a Joseph Abou Mrad goal. It was the main stadium used to host the 2000 Asian Cup held in Lebanon; six matches were played in the stadium including the opening match and the final. In 2011 the stadium hosted the famed 2–1 victory against South Korea in the 2014 World Cup qualification, sending Lebanon to the final round of qualification for the first time. Over 40,000 spectators were present to watch the match.

The national team, however, also play in other stadiums such as the Saida Municipal Stadium located in Sidon. Built over the sea, the stadium holds 22,600 people, and was one of the venues to host the 2000 Asian Cup. Other stadiums in which the national team play include the Tripoli Municipal Stadium and the Beirut Municipal Stadium.

Media
Produced by Fulwell 73, FIFA released Captains in 2022, an eight-part sports docuseries following six national team captains in their respective 2022 FIFA World Cup qualification campaigns. Hassan Maatouk, representing Lebanon, starred in the first season alongside Thiago Silva (Brazil), Luka Modrić (Croatia), Pierre-Emerick Aubameyang (Gabon), Andre Blake (Jamaica) and Brian Kaltak (Vanuatu). It was released by Netflix, and also shown on FIFA's own streaming platform, FIFA+.

Results and fixtures

The following is a list of match results in the last 12 months, as well as any future matches that have been scheduled.

2022

2023

Players

Current squad
The following players were called up for the friendly match against the United Arab Emirates on 30 December 2022.

Recent call-ups
The following footballers were part of a national selection in the past 12 months, but are not part of the current squad.

Individual records

Most-capped players

. Highlighted names denote a player still playing or available for selection.

Top scorers

. Highlighted names denote a player still playing or available for selection.

Competitive record

FIFA World Cup

Although the Lebanese Football Association was formed in 1933, Lebanon's first qualification campaign for the FIFA World Cup took place in the 1986 edition. However, after playing four matches, Lebanon withdrew due to the ongoing civil war, and their results were subsequently annulled. The country's first full qualification campaign came two editions later, in 1994, where they finished third in their group with two wins, four draws, and two losses. Ever since, Lebanon have participated in every iteration of the World Cup qualifiers.

Lebanon first reached the final round of World Cup qualification during the 2014 campaign. After beating Bangladesh 4–2 on aggregate in the second round, Lebanon qualified to the third round, where they were drawn with South Korea, Kuwait, and the United Arab Emirates. The team beat South Korea in a historic 2–1 win at home, coming second in their group and qualifying to the fourth (and final) round for the first time. Grouped with Iran, South Korea, Uzbekistan, and Qatar, Lebanon finished last in Group A and were eliminated with only one win and two draws in eight games.

AFC Asian Cup

Lebanon's first qualification campaign for the AFC Asian Cup came at the 1972 edition; drawn in Group B of the Western Zone, Lebanon came second thanks to a 3–2 victory over neighbors Syria and advanced to the next stage. In the decisive semi-final match against Iraq, Lebanon lost 4–1 and were knocked-out. Lebanon won a consolatory third-place match against Jordan.

The 2000 edition was Lebanon's first participation in the finals, when the country hosted the event. Following a 4–0 defeat to Iran in the competition's opening match, Lebanon came from behind to draw 2–2 against Iraq; Abbas Chahrour became Lebanon's first goalscorer in the competition. Lebanon drew once again, 1–1 against Thailand, and were eliminated, finishing last in the group.

After finishing the 2019 third round of qualification unbeaten, Lebanon qualified to the Asian Cup for the first time in their history. In the finals, Lebanon lost the first group stage match 2–0 to eventual champions Qatar, before losing once again by the same score to Saudi Arabia. In the final match of the group, Lebanon needed a win by four goals or more against North Korea to qualify to the knock-out stage. Despite conceding an early free-kick goal, Lebanon went on to win the match 4–1 thanks to a brace by Hilal El-Helwe. However, they lost out to Vietnam in the third-place ranking due to having received more yellow cards, and were knocked out of the competition.

Summer Olympic Games

Lebanon's senior team have never qualified to the Summer Olympics final tournament; their first qualification campaign was for Rome 1960. After losing the first two group stage games against Iraq, Lebanon withdrew and the two remaining matches were awarded to their opponent Turkey. Lebanon participated in two more qualifications, in 1968 and 1972, failing to qualify to the final tournament on both occasions. Starting from the 1992 edition, the Olympic Football Tournament has been reserved for national under-23 teams.

FIFA Arab Cup

Lebanon have taken part in all iterations of the Arab Cup, except the 1985 and 1992 editions. They hosted the inaugural edition in 1963, in a group containing Tunisia, Syria, Kuwait, and Jordan. After beating Kuwait 6–0 through a hat-trick by Mardik Tchaparian, Lebanon lost 3–2 to Syria, before winning 5–0 against Jordan. In a decisive match against Tunisia, Muhieddine Itani scored an own goal, and Lebanon lost 1–0, finishing third.

Lebanon finished in fourth place in the subsequent two editions (1964 and 1966); ever since, they have failed to pass the group stage.

WAFF Championship
Bar the 2008 and 2010 editions, Lebanon have participated in every WAFF Championship; however, they have failed to qualify past the group stage on all occasions. Their first participation in the WAFF Championship was in 2000, at the inaugural edition. Drawn with Iraq, hosts Jordan, and Kyrgyzstan, Lebanon finished third in their group with one win, one draw, and one loss.

Pan Arab Games
After participating in the inaugural edition of the Pan Arab Games, at Alexandria 1953, Lebanon hosted the 1957 edition. Topping a group containing Syria, Saudi Arabia, and Jordan, Lebanon reached the semi-finals where they lost 4–2 to Tunisia. Due to Morocco withdrawing from the third-place match, Lebanon finished the tournament in third place. Lebanon also came third in 1997, once again as hosts. With two draws and a win, Lebanon came second in their group and qualified to the semi-finals, which they lost after extra time to Syria. Lebanon finished in third place after beating Kuwait 3–1.

Asian Games
The Lebanon national senior team only participated once at the Asian Games, at Bangkok 1998. Thanks to a 5–1 win against Cambodia, Lebanon qualified past the preliminary round and were drawn with Qatar, Thailand, and Kazakhstan in the second round. Following two 1–0 defeats, respectively to Qatar and Thailand, Lebanon won 3–0 against Kazakhstan in their final encounter of the group stage. However, the three points weren't enough to qualify Lebanon to the knockout round.

Mediterranean Games
Lebanon's first participation at the Mediterranean Games was in 1959, when they hosted the event. They lost both legs against Italy B and Turkey B, finishing last with no points. Lebanon's senior team participated two more times, in 1963 and 1987, failing to qualify past the group stage on both occasions.

Other tournaments
Lebanon won their first tournament—albeit unofficial—at the 1964 Tripoli Fair Tournament; with three wins and one draw, Lebanon finished first in a group containing Libya, Morocco, Sudan, and Malta. In 1998, Lebanon participated at the Friendship Tournament in the United Arab Emirates where, with two draws and a defeat, they finished in third place out of four. Lebanon also finished in third place at the 2009 King's Cup in Thailand; after losing to the hosts in the semi-finals, they won against North Korea in the third-place match.

See also

 List of men's national association football teams
 Lebanese Premier League
 Lebanese football league system
 Football in Lebanon
 Sport in Lebanon

Notes and references

Notes

References

Bibliography

External links 

  
 FIFA team profile
 AFC team profile 
 WAFF team profile 
 ELO team records

 
Asian national association football teams
Football teams in Lebanon
National sports teams established in 1933